The following is a list of public housing estates in Chai Wan and Siu Sai Wan, Hong Kong, including Home Ownership Scheme (HOS), Private Sector Participation Scheme (PSPS), Sandwich Class Housing Scheme (SCHS), Flat-for-Sale Scheme (FFSS), and Tenants Purchase Scheme (TPS) estates.

History

Overview

Cheerful Garden 

Cheerful Garden is a Home Ownership Scheme and Private Sector Participation Scheme court on the reclaimed land at the north of Siu Sai Wan Road, Siu Sai Wan. It has 5 blocks built in 1995, jointly developed by the Hong Kong Housing Authority and Chevalier Group.

Cheerful Garden is in Primary One Admission (POA) School Net 16. Within the school net are multiple aided schools (operated independently but funded with government money) and two government schools: Shau Kei Wan Government Primary School and Aldrich Bay Government Primary School.

Houses

Dip Tsui Court 

Dip Tsui Court is a Green Form Subsidised Home Ownership Scheme (GFSHOS) court in Chai Wan Road, Chai Wan and the first GFSHOS court on Hong Kong Island. Formerly the site of Block 13 of the old Chai Wan Estate, the court has 1 block comprising 828 flats with sellable areas of 187 to 320 square feet at prices between HK$980,000 and HK$2.07 million. The estimated material date of Dip Tsui Court will be 31 August 2022. Average selling price is HK$6,100 per square feet, by applying a discount of 51 per cent from the assessed market value. It is expected to commerce in 2022.

House

Fullview Garden 

Fullview Garden is a Home Ownership Scheme court and Private Sector Participation Scheme court at the south of Siu Sai Wan Road, Siu Sai Wan. Formerly the site of intelligence gathering centre established by British Armed Force until the 1980s, the court has 11 blocks built in 1993 and 1994, jointly developed by the Hong Kong Housing Authority and Chevalier Group.

Houses

Fung Wah Estate and King Tsui Court 

Fung Wah Estate is a mixed public/TPS estate on a hill in southwest Chai Wan. It consists of 2 residential blocks completed in 1991. Another HOS court, King Tsui Court, is also located in the estate. In 2000, some of the rental flats were sold to tenants through Tenants Purchase Scheme Phase 3.

Houses

Greenwood Terrace 

Greenwood Terrace is a Home Ownership Scheme and Private Sector Participation Scheme court in Chai Wan, with close proximity to MTR Chai Wan station. It was jointly developed by Hong Kong Housing Authority and New World Development. It consists of 7 residential blocks completed in 1985 and is one of the largest estates in Chai Wan.

Houses

Hang Tsui Court 

Hang Tsui Court is a Home Ownership Scheme court on the reclaimed land in Chai Wan, near Chai Wan Park, Yue Wan Estate, Tsui Wan Estate and Tsui Lok Estate. It has 2 blocks built in 1997.

Houses

Harmony Garden 

Harmony Garden is a Home Ownership Scheme and Private Sector Participation Scheme court on the reclaimed land along Siu Sai Wan Road, Siu Sai Wan. It has 8 blocks built in 1997, jointly developed by the Hong Kong Housing Authority and Chevalier Group.

Houses

Hing Man Estate 

Hing Man Estate is a public housing estate in Chai Wan, located at the north of Hing Wah Estate. It consists of 3 Cruciform-typed blocks completed in 1982.

Houses

Hing Wah Estate 

Hing Wah Estate is a public housing estate in Chai Wan, near MTR Chai Wan station.

The estate comprises 10 residential buildings. The 7 "Old Slab" blocks belong to Hing Wah (I) Estate completed in 1976, while the 3 "Harmony 1" buildings belong to Hing Wah (II) Estate completed in 1999 and 2000.

Background 
Hing Wah (I) Estate was a resettlement estate which had 3 resettlement blocks completed in 1971. 7 more "Old Slab" blocks were completed in 1976, which formed Hing Wah (II) Estate. The 3 resettlement blocks in Hing Wah (I) Estate were demolished in 1995, replaced by two rental blocks in 1999 and one HOS block in 2000 respectively. However, the government decided to change an HOS block from sale to rental finally, and renamed it from "Hing Tsui Court" to "Hing Tsui House".

Houses

Hiu Tsui Court 

Hiu Tsui Court is a Home Ownership Scheme court in at the south of Siu Sai Wan Road in Siu Sai Wan, near Siu Sai Wan Estate. Formerly the site of intelligence gathering centre established by British Armed Force until the 1980s. It has two blocks built in 1990.

Hui Tsui Court is in Primary One Admission (POA) School Net 16. Within the school net are multiple aided schools (operated independently but funded with government money) and two government schools: Shau Kei Wan Government Primary School and Aldrich Bay Government Primary School.

Houses

Kai Tsui Court 

Kai Tsui Court is a Home Ownership Scheme court in at the south of Siu Sai Wan Road in Siu Sai Wan, near Siu Sai Wan Estate. Formerly the site of intelligence gathering centre established by British Armed Force until the 1980s, the court has two blocks built in 1993.

Kai Tsui is in Primary One Admission (POA) School Net 16. Within the school net are multiple aided schools (operated independently but funded with government money) and two government schools: Shau Kei Wan Government Primary School and Aldrich Bay Government Primary School.

Houses

Lok Hin Terrace 

Lok Hin Terrace is a Home Ownership Scheme and Private Sector Participation Scheme court in Chai Wan, located within a short walk to the MTR Chai Wan station. Formerly the site of Block 1 to 8 of old Chai Wan Estate, the court comprises five residential blocks of 31 storeys each, providing a total of 1,550 units.

Houses

Neptune Terrace 

Neptune Terrace is a Home Ownership Scheme and Private Sector Participation Scheme court in Chai Wan, with a few distance to MTR Chai Wan station and Greenwood Terrace. It was jointly developed by Hong Kong Housing Authority and New World Development.

Houses

Shan Tsui Court 

Shan Tsui Court is a Home Ownership Scheme court in Chai Wan, near Hing Man Estate. It has 4 blocks built in 1981 and it is one of the earliest HOS courts in Hong Kong.

Houses

Siu Sai Wan Estate 

Siu Sai Wan Estate is the only public housing estate in Siu Sai Wan, Chai Wan. Formerly the site of intelligence gathering centre established by British Armed Force until the 1980s, the estate has 12 residential buildings completed in 1990 and 1993 respectively.

Siu Sai Wan Estate is in Primary One Admission (POA) School Net 16. Within the school net are multiple aided schools (operated independently but funded with government money) and two government schools: Shau Kei Wan Government Primary School and Aldrich Bay Government Primary School.

Houses

Tsui Lok Estate 

Tsui Lok Estate is a public housing estate in Chai Wan, located near Chai Wan Park, Yue Wan Estate and Tsui Wan Estate. Built on the former site of Yue Wan Temporary Housing Area on reclaimed land in Chai Wan, the estate consists of only 1 residential block built in 1999.

Houses

Tsui Wan Estate 

Tsui Wan Estate is a mixed public/TPS estate in Chai Wan, located near Chai Wan Park, Yue Wan Estate and Tsui Lok Estate. Built on the reclaimed land in Chai Wan, the estate consists of 4 residential blocks built in 1988. In 1999, some of the flats were sold to tenants through Tenants Purchase Scheme Phase 2.

Houses

Walton Estate 

Walton Estate is a Home Ownership Scheme and Private Sector Participation Scheme court in Chai Wan, near MTR Chai Wan station. Built on the reclaimed land, the estate has 4 blocks built in 1982 and is one of the oldest HOS courts in Hong Kong.

Houses

Wah Ha Estate 

Wah Ha Estate is a public housing estate in Chai Wan, just adjacent to Chai Wan station. It is a 187-flat single block which was converted from former Chai Wan Factory Estate built in 1959. It was completed in 2016.

Wan Tsui Estate, Yan Tsui Court and Yuet Chui Court 

Wan Tsui Estate is a public estate located at a part of former Chai Wan Estate and opposite to Chai Wan station. It now has 11 residential buildings completed between 1979 and 2001.

Yan Tsui Court and Yuet Chui Court are the Home Ownership Scheme courts in Chai Wan, next to Wan Tsui Estate. They have 2 blocks (built in 1983) and 1 block (built in 1999) respectively.

Background 
Wan Tsui Estate was formed between the late 1970s and early 1980s by the redevelopment of Chai Wan Estate and the assignment of Block 16 to 22 of Chai Wan Estate to Wan Tsui Estate. Also, Block 21 and Block 22 of Chai Wan Estate were redecorated and renamed to On Tsui House and Ning Tsui House, but they were finally demolished in 1996.

Houses

Wan Tsui Estate

Yan Tsui Court

Yuet Chui Court

Yee Tsui Court 

Yee Tsui Court is a Home Ownership Scheme court on the reclaimed land in Chai Wan, near Chai Wan Sports Centre. It has 3 blocks built in 1981, and it is one of the earliest HOS courts in Hong Kong.

Houses

Yue Wan Estate 

Yue Wan Estate is a public estate located near Chai Wan Park, Tsui Wan Estate and Tsui Lok Estate. Built on the reclaimed land in Chai Wan, the estate consists of 4 residential blocks, which were developed in 2 phases and built in 1977 and 1978 respectively.

Houses

Chai Wan Estate 

Chai Wan Estate is a public estate near Chai Wan Road. It had a total of 27 residential blocks before demolition.

Background 
Chai Wan Estate was a resettlement estate and had a total of 27 residential blocks. It has started redevelopment since the 1970s, and all residential blocks were demolished between 1975 and 2001. Wan Tsui Estate, Lok Hin Terrace, Chai Wan Municipal Services Building and several schools were constructed in the site of former Chai Wan Estate. But Block 21 and 22 were reserved and redecorated to be a part of Wan Chui Estate until they were demolished in 1996.

The site of the former Blocks 14 and 15 was redeveloped in 2010. The new two-block estate carries on the name "Chai Wan Estate".

Houses

Lin Tsui Estate

Located next to Lin Shing Road and Wan Tsui Estate, Chai Wan, Lin Tsui Estate (Chinese: 連翠邨) is a single-block public estate inaugurated on 12 July 2018. The only building, Lin Tsui House, is 36-story high and located above a 3-story platform, with 8 flats on each floor.

References 

Chai Wan
Siu Sai Wan